Iwayagawauchi Dam is a concrete gravity dam located in Saga Prefecture in Japan. The dam is used for flood control. The catchment area of the dam is 10.7 km2. The dam impounds about 14  ha of land when full and can store 2500 thousand cubic meters of water. The construction of the dam was started on 1967 and completed in 1973.

References

Dams in Saga Prefecture
1973 establishments in Japan